The Calle de Toledo is a historic street in central Madrid, Spain, running across the Centro and Arganzuela districts.

History and description 
Straddling along the Centro and Arganzuela districts, it starts at the Plaza Mayor and ends at the Glorieta de las Pirámides. It was already named Toledo in the 16th century. Until the late 15th century it ended at the Hospital of La Latina. In the early 17th century the part near the Plaza Mayor was widened. Following the 1790 fire in the Plaza Mayor, the buildings of the Portal de Cofreros were rebuilt with new materials following the anti-fire regulations dictated by Juan de Villanueva. The street consolidated as one of the specialised commercial streets in the city centre by the early 20th century. The image of the northernmost end near the Plaza Mayor became a part of the Antifascist collective memory with the photograph of the ¡No pasarán! banner hanged in the street during the Spanish Civil War.

The landmarks located in the street include  (at the junction with the calle de Arganzuela) and the Instituto San Isidro.

On 20 January 2021, four people were killed in a building explosion.

References 
Informational notes

Citations

Bibliography
 
 
 
 
 
 
 

Streets in Madrid
Embajadores neighborhood, Madrid
Palacio neighborhood, Madrid
Arganzuela